Sohail Castle is a castle in Fuengirola, Spain.
It was built in AD 956 by Abd-ar-Rahman III to strengthen the coastal defenses. In 2000, the Town of Fuengirola renovated the ruins of the castle, turning it into a tourist attraction and functioning space used for concerts and other festivals. Excavated stone ruins that are on public display at the western base of the hill on which the castle sits date back to at least 300 BC, before the Roman Republic occupied Fuengirola.

See also 
 Battle of Fuengirola

References

External links

 
 
 

Buildings and structures completed in the 10th century
Castles in Andalusia
Fuengirola